Oszkár Nagy (1893-1965) was a Hungarian painter. Representative for the school of painting from Baia Mare, Romania.

References

External links
 The Baia Mare Art Museum/Centrul_artistic_Baia_Mare

1893 births
1965 deaths
20th-century Hungarian painters
Hungarian male painters
20th-century Hungarian male artists